Tharaka Waduge (born 27 February 1986) is a Sri Lankan cricketer. He made his List A debut for Kurunegala Youth Cricket Club in the 2006–07 Premier Limited Overs Tournament on 8 November 2006. He made his first-class debut for Kurunegala Youth Cricket Club in Tier B of the 2006–07 Premier Trophy on 17 November 2006. He made his Twenty20 debut for Lankan Cricket Club in the 2012 CSN Premier Clubs T20 Tournament on 27 March 2012.

References

External links
 

1986 births
Living people
Sri Lankan cricketers
Kandy Customs Sports Club cricketers
Kurunegala Youth Cricket Club cricketers
Lankan Cricket Club cricketers
Ragama Cricket Club cricketers
Sebastianites Cricket and Athletic Club cricketers
Cricketers from Colombo